"All the Things She Said" is a song by Scottish rock group Simple Minds, released as the third single from their seventh studio album, Once Upon a Time.  It was sung by lead vocalist Jim Kerr, with backing vocals provided by American singer Robin Clark who also appeared in the promotional video.

The song reached number 9 on the UK Singles Chart and number 28 on the US Billboard Hot 100. It was featured in the 2013 video game, Grand Theft Auto V, on the fictional radio station Los Santos Rock Radio.

Content

Singer Jim Kerr said the song was based on an article he read about Polish political prisoners in the Soviet Union. "There was an interview with wives of guys that had been away for a long time, taken away, and some of the beautiful quotations that the women had used became sort of the background for that song," he said.

Charts

References

1985 songs
Simple Minds songs
Song recordings produced by Jimmy Iovine
Song recordings produced by Bob Clearmountain
Virgin Records singles
Songs written by Jim Kerr
Songs written by Charlie Burchill
Songs written by Mick MacNeil
Music videos directed by Zbigniew Rybczyński